Liu Xiang (born 1 September 1996) is a Chinese competitive swimmer.

Early life
Born Liu Jiaxin in Tianhe District, Guangzhou, she is the only daughter to her parents. Both of her parents were basketball players, but she chose swimming.

Liu is an alumnus of South China Normal University.

Swimming

At the 2015 World Aquatics Championships, Liu won the bronze medal in the 50-meter backstroke behind teammate Fu Yuanhui at the 2015 World Aquatics Championships in Kazan, Russia. She also competed at the 2016 Summer Olympics.

In the 2018 Asian Games Liu broke the 27-second barrier in the women's 50m backstroke as she set a world record and took the gold medal.

Personal bests

Long course (50-meter pool)

Short course (25-meter pool)

Key:  NR = National Record, AS = Asian Record, WR = World Record

References

1996 births
Living people
Olympic swimmers of China
Chinese female backstroke swimmers
Chinese female freestyle swimmers
Swimmers at the 2016 Summer Olympics
World Aquatics Championships medalists in swimming
Swimmers at the 2018 Asian Games
Asian Games medalists in swimming
Swimmers from Guangzhou
World record holders in swimming
Asian Games gold medalists for China
Asian Games silver medalists for China
Medalists at the 2018 Asian Games
20th-century Chinese women
21st-century Chinese women